The Voisin VII was a French reconnaissance pusher biplane aircraft of World War I.

Design
The Voisin VII was a biplane with a single engine in a pusher configuration, developed by Voisin in 1916 as an enlarged Voisin V with the engine cooling radiators moved to the nose. However, the Voisin VII was underpowered, even with improvements over its predecessor.

Operators

 Aéronautique Militaire

Specifications

References

Citations

Bibliography

07
1910s French military reconnaissance aircraft
Single-engined pusher aircraft
Biplanes
Military aircraft of World War I
Aircraft first flown in 1916
1910s French bomber aircraft